Talovka is a rural locality (a settlement) in Pribaykalsky District, Republic of Buryatia, Russia. The population was 1,956 as of 2010. There are 22 streets.

References 

Rural localities in Okinsky District